The Rt Rev  Calvert Leopold Friday CMG is the current Bishop of the Windward Islands.

He was born into an ecclesiastical family – his father is the Revd Fr Calvert Friday, now assistant minister at St Matthew's, Biabou, Saint Vincent.

Notes

Living people
21st-century Anglican bishops in the Caribbean
Anglican bishops of the Windward Islands
Companions of the Order of St Michael and St George
Year of birth missing (living people)